The R3 is a line of Rodalies de Catalunya's Barcelona commuter rail service, operated by Renfe Operadora. It runs northwards from the Barcelona area to the French border town of Latour-de-Carol, passing through the Vallès Oriental, Osona and Ripollès regions. According to 2008 data, the line's average weekday ridership is 22,841.

Together with lines R1,  and R4, the R3 (then simply numbered line 3) started services in 1989 as one of the first lines of the Cercanías commuter rail system for Barcelona, known as Rodalies Barcelona. The section north of Vic had not previously been considered part of the Barcelona commuter rail service; designated Ca5, the services running on it were part of Renfe Operadora's regional rail division in Catalonia. In the long-term future, it is projected that the R3 will be rerouted through the Aragó Tunnel in Barcelona. Furthermore, it is planned to be extended southwards to Castelldefels, thanks to the construction of a new branch line from Cornellà de Llobregat.

The R3 is the Barcelona commuter rail service line with the highest number of service incidents, and has been the recipient of much criticism from its users and local authorities. Minor delays occur constantly on the line, most of which can be attributed to the fact that it uses single-track infrastructure for almost all of its length. There have been calls for the conversion of the line's route to double track since the 1990s, especially on the Barcelona–Vic section.

List of stations

References

Bibliography

External links
 Rodalies de Catalunya official website
 Schedule for the R3 (PDF format)
 R3 Rodalies (rod3cat) on Twitter. Official Twitter account by Rodalies de Catalunya for the R3 with service status updates (tweets usually published only in Catalan)
 
 R3 (rodalia 3) on Twitter. Unofficial Twitter account by Rodalia.info monitoring real-time information about the R3 by its users.
 Information about the R3 at trenscat.cat 
 pqnoensfotintren on WordPress. Official blog of the association "Perquè no ens fotin el tren" (Catalan for "Because we want to keep our trains"), which advocates for the improvement of the service offered on the R3.

3
Railway services introduced in 1989